Eleutherna, also called Apollonia
(), was an ancient city-state  in Crete, Greece, which lies 25 km southeast of Rethymno in Rethymno regional unit. Archaeologists excavated  the site, located on a narrow northern spur of Mount Ida, the highest mountain in  Crete. The site is about 1 km south of modern town of Eleftherna, about 8 km north east of Moni Arkadiou, in the current municipality of Rethymno. It flourished from the Dark Ages of Greece’s early history until Byzantine times.

History

In the systematic Eleutherna project, a team of archaeologists from the University of Crete led by Prof. N. Stampolidis has been in charge since 1984. Surveys and systematic excavations have revealed the city's settlement patterns, sanctuaries and necropoleis in Orthi Petra, even stone quarries in the surroundings of the Prines hill. The discovery of the remains of four females in Orthi Petra was declared one of top 10 discoveries of 2009 by the Archaeological Institute of America.Anagnostis Agelarakis was instrumental in helping to identify an Iron Age matriline—a so-called “dynasty of priestesses” — at the site, based on the dental epigenetic traits of the individuals buried there. The Museum of Ancient Eleutherna, directly linked to the archaeological site, was inaugurated in June 2016.

During the ninth century BC, in sub-Mycenaean times, in the Geometric Period of the later Greek Dark Ages, Dorians colonized the city on a steep, naturally fortified ridge. The city's location made it a natural crossroads, as it lay between Cydonia on the northwest coast and Knossos, and between the shore, where it controlled its ports, Stavromenos and Panormos, and the great sanctuary cave near the peak of Ida, Idaion Andron.  The Dorian city evolved in the Archaic Period in a similar vein as did Lato and Dreros, its contemporaneous Dorian counterparts.

In 220 BC the city of Eleutherna triggered the outbreak of the Lyttian War by accusing the Rhodians of the assassination of their leader Timarchus. The Eleuthernans eventually declared war on Rhodes. During the following conflict Eleutherna was at first allied with Cnossus and Gortys, but later they were compelled to change sides by the Polyrrhenians and joined the opposite coalition led by the Macedonian king Philip V.

With the Roman conquest of Crete in 68/67 BCE, luxurious villas, baths, and other public buildings demonstrate that Eleutherna was a prosperous centre through the Imperial period, until the catastrophic earthquake of 365 CE. Eleutherna was the seat of a Christian bishop: bishop Euphratas constructed a large basilica in the mid-seventh century. The attacks of caliph Harun Al-Rashid in the later eighth century, together with another earthquake in 796, and the subsequent Arab rule in Crete, led to the final abandonment of the site. Following the occupation of the island by the Republic of Venice, a Catholic diocese was established, still a Roman Catholic titular bishopric today.

Public exhibitions in 1993 and 1994, and especially the comprehensive exhibition of 2004 at the Museum of Cycladic Art, Athens, have introduced the archaeological site to the general public. On the last occasion the Louvre lent the seventh-century BCE "Lady of Auxerre", now given a definitive Cretan context with comparable finds at Eleutherna.

See also 
 Museum of Ancient Eleutherna
 Eleutherna Bridge
 List of ancient Greek cities

Notes

Bibliography
 Nicholas Chr. Stampolidis, Eleutherna on Crete: The Wider Horizon. In Aruz, J. and Seymour, M. (eds). Assyria to Iberia: Art and Culture in the Iron Age, Metropolitan Museum of Art symposia, pp. 283–295, Yale University Press, 2016. 
 Anagnostis Agelarakis, The anthropology of Tomb A1K1 of Orthi Petra in Eleutherna. A Narrative of the Bones: Aspects of the Human Condition in Geometric-Archaic Eleutherna (Athens, 2005).
 Kotsonas, Antonis, The Archaeology of Tomb A1K1 of Orthi Petra in Eleutherna: the early Iron Age pottery (Heraklion, University of Crete, 2008).
 S. Andreas Koudellou, Eleutherna 2006-2009, The University of Crete, January 10, 2009.

External links 
 Museum of Ancient Eleutherna
 Ancient Eleutherna from the Greek Ministry of Culture
 Eleutherna 1998 Overview

Cretan city-states
Ancient Greek archaeological sites in Crete
Roman sites in Greece
Populated places in ancient Crete
Former populated places in Greece
Iron Age sites in Greece
Populated places in Rethymno (regional unit)